Sorbose is a ketose belonging to the group of sugars known as monosaccharides. It has a sweetness that is equivalent to sucrose (table sugar). The commercial production of vitamin C (ascorbic acid) often begins with sorbose.  L-Sorbose is the configuration of the naturally occurring sugar.

References

Ketohexoses